Live at the House of Blues may refer to:

Albums
 Live at the House of Blues (Adolescents album), 2004
 Live at the House of Blues (Guttermouth album), 2003
 Live at the House of Blues (Thrice album), 2008
 Live at the House of Blues (Tupac Shakur album), 2005
 Live at the House of Blues (The Vandals album), 2004
 Greatest Hits: Live at the House of Blues, by DJ Quik, 2006
 Live at the House of Blues, New Orleans, by Better than Ezra, 2004
 Live at the House of Blues, by Goldfinger, 2004
 Live at the House of Blues, Cleveland 9.15.07, by Sum 41, 2011
 Live at the House of Blues, Sunset Strip, by Jesse McCartney, 2009

Videos
 Live at the House of Blues, by Reel Big Fish, 2003
 Renegade Live @ The House of Blues, by Renegade, 2010

See also
 Blues Brothers & Friends: Live from House of Blues, a 1997 album
 House of Yes: Live from House of Blues, by Yes, 2000
 Live from the House of Blues, a 1995 American television series
 Live from the House of Blues, a 2001 DVD by the Psychedelic Furs